Ghoul Patrol is a run and gun video game developed by LucasArts and published by JVC Musical Industries for the Super Nintendo Entertainment System in 1994.

It is a sequel to the Zombies Ate My Neighbors (1993). Both games were re-released together as part of Lucasfilm Classic Games: Zombies Ate My Neighbors and Ghoul Patrol for Nintendo Switch, PlayStation 4, Xbox One and Windows in 2021 by Disney Interactive.

Gameplay 

The game stars Zeke and Julie, the protagonists from Zombies Ate My Neighbors, who must travel through five worlds to save their town from a horror exhibit come to life.

Development 

According to Toshiyasu Morita, a programmer and technology manager at LucasArts during the mid-1990s, this sequel was made by a third party that licensed the use of the Zombies Ate My Neighbors engine for this purpose.

The game was developed by LucasArts, but most of the development work was outsourced by a small Malaysian studio called Motion Pixel. It serves as a sequel to Zombies Ate My Neighbors, although it originally did not begin development as a sequel to the game, but merely as an unrelated game that used the same gameplay engine.

Release 

It was released by JVC Musical Industries in November 1994 in North America, and later in the year in Europe. A Japanese version was published by the JVC subsidiary Victor Entertainment in 1995.

It was later re-released digitally on the Wii Virtual Console in 2010, and for the Nintendo Switch, Xbox One and Windows in 2021 together with its predecessor.

A Genesis version was under development, but was not released.

Reception
GamePro commented that "Ghoul Patrol is the closest you can get to the acclaimed Zombies Ate My Neighbors, and it's a worthy successor." They particularly praised the "outrageous 360-degree shoot-em-up action" and detailed, cartoony graphics. Electronic Gaming Monthly gave it a 7.8 out of 10, calling it "A worthy sequel to Zombies Ate My Neighbors" and "A great salute to old, late-night horror movies."

Notes

References

External links

1994 video games
Cancelled Sega Genesis games
LucasArts games
Run and gun games
Super Nintendo Entertainment System games
Video game sequels
Video games developed in the United States
Video games developed in Malaysia
Video games featuring female protagonists
Virtual Console games
Video games about zombies
Nintendo Switch games
PlayStation 4 games
Xbox One games
Windows games